Hippotion joiceyi is a moth of the  family Sphingidae. It is found in Indonesia.

The length of the forewings is about 30 mm. It is very similar to Hippotion brennus form brennus but immediately distinguishable by the lack of paired subdorsal white spots on the abdomen. The frons and upperside of the labial palps is dark brown. The upperside of the abdomen is unicolorous orange-brown, contrasting strongly with the dark brown and pale grey thorax.

References

 Pinhey, E (1962): Hawk Moths of Central and Southern Africa. Longmans Southern Africa, Cape Town.

Hippotion
Moths described in 1922